The 2005 Australian Formula 4000 Championship was a CAMS sanctioned motor racing title for drivers of Formula 4000 racing cars.

This was the first title to be contested under the Australian Formula 4000 Championship name although the category had competed for the Australian Drivers' Championship under its previous Formula Holden and Formula Brabham names from 1989 to 2002 and then as Formula 4000 in 2003 and 2004.

Calendar
The title was contested over a six-round series with two races per round.
 Round 1, Phillip Island Grand Prix Circuit, Victoria, 20–22 May
 Round 2, Queensland Raceway, Ipswich, Queensland, 1–3 July
 Round 3, Eastern Creek International Raceway, New South Wales, 22–24 July
 Round 4, Phillip Island Grand Prix Circuit, Victoria, 19–21 August
 Round 5, Oran Park Raceway, New South Wales, 16–18 September
 Round 6, Wakefield Park, New South Wales, 11–13 November

Points system
Championship points were awarded on a 20-15-12-10-8-6-4-3-2-1 basis to the top ten finishers in each race.
A bonus point was allocated to the driver setting pole position at each round and to the driver achieving the fastest lap in each race.

Results

Notes and references

Further reading
 Grant Rowley, The Annual - Australian Motorsport - Number 1/ 2005

External links
 Hackett Crowned F4000 Champion

Formula 4000 Championship
Formula Holden